The North American Car, Utility and Truck of the Year are a set of automotive awards announced at a news conference each January at the North American International Auto Show in Detroit.  The jury consists of no more than 60 automotive journalists from the US and Canada.

In 2016, a Board of Directors was created and the award became a 501 6(c) corporation. The new Board consists of: Mark Phelan, President; Matt DeLorenzo, Vice President; and Lauren Fix, Secretary / Treasurer. 

For 2017 a new category was added to this award: Utility, with the Chrysler Pacifica the first winner.

Example

Pre-1992

1994–1999

2000–2009

2010–2016

2017–present
From 2017, a new segment for Utility Vehicles was created. 

Underline indicates the vehicle was nominated for World Car of the Year.

Bold indicates the vehicle won World Car of the Year.

See also

 List of motor vehicle awards

References

External links

Motor vehicle awards
Car
Road transportation in North America